Juan Carlos Boveri (San Nicolás de los Arroyos, Buenos Aires, September 14, 1950) is an Argentine author of novel and short stories, as well as a psychologist, sociologist and cultural anthropologist. His works is characterized by its originality and depth, as well as a criticism of human society.

Works 
 Dios duerme
 Límites 
 Ecos de otro
 Monólogo a una mujer dormida
 Análisis del gas humano

References 
 Proyecto X
 Escritores de culto
 Libros y escritores

External links 
 Library of Congress
 Entretanto Magazine

1950 births
Argentine essayists
Male essayists
Argentine male writers
Living people